Kahriz (also Romanized as Kahrīz; also known as Kahrīz-e Kamālvand) is a village in Dehpir Rural District, in the Central District of Khorramabad County, Lorestan Province, Iran. At the 2006 census, its population was 525, in 116 families.

References 

Towns and villages in Khorramabad County